Why Does the World Exist?: An Existential Detective Story is a nonfiction work authored by Jim Holt. He and the book were on the LA Times bestseller list during the last quarter of 2012, and the first quarter of 2013. The book was also a 2012 National Book Critics Award finalist for nonfiction.

Central theme
A central question of the book is 'Why is there something rather than nothing?', which lies in the domain between philosophy and scientific cosmology. Gottfried Wilhelm Leibniz was the first to publish the question in 1714. In this book, the author records a quest to answer the question through a series of interviews and discussions. Some of the people interviewed are John Updike, David Deutsch, Adolf Grünbaum, John Leslie, Derek Parfit, Roger Penrose, Richard Swinburne, Steven Weinberg, and Andrei Linde. Along the way, Jim Holt also introduces the reader to  the philosophy of mathematics, theology, physics, ontology, epistemology, and other subjects.

Review

—The New York Times

See also
Problem of why there is anything at all

References

External links
 Books of the Times - Into the Nothing, After Something
 The New York Review of Books - What Can You Really Know?
 Philosopher Jim Holt on Nothingness, the God Wars, and His New Book: “I’m a Little Unhinged”
 Has the Meaning of Nothing Changed?
 The Philosophers Magazine - The best books of 2012
 
 

 At Google Books

Contemporary philosophical literature
Cosmology books
Metaphysics literature
American non-fiction books
Philosophy books
W. W. Norton & Company books
2012 non-fiction books